is a Japanese professional wrestler who currently works for Dragon Gate.

Career
He had a strong background in Greco-Roman wrestling and debuted on November 3, 2013 for IGF. He went to a time limit draw against Akira Jo. He stopped wrestling to focus on college and returned on IGF's December 31, 2013 show in another time limit draw.

He continued wrestling mostly for IGF throughout 2014 and 2015 and made appearances for various promotions starting in 2016. On October 2, 2016, he and Tomohiko Hashimoto, captured Apache Pro's WEW World Tag Team Championship. The team held the titles until December 25, 2016, when they were defeated by Tatsuhito Takaiwa and Tetsuhiro Kuroda. He became a full-time member of Dramatic Dream Team in 2018, but resigned on April 30, 2019. Almost immediately after, he started wrestling exclusively for Dragon Gate.

He became a member of Masaaki Mochizuki's unit, Mochizuki Dojo in the summer of 2019, after briefly feuding with Mochizuki. The unit was disbanded in December 2019 with most of its members merging into the Dragon Gate unit.

He captured the Open the Brave Gate Championship on November 3, 2020 by defeating Kaito Ishida.

Okuda made his return to MMA, facing kickboxer Hiroaki Suzuki on October 10, 2021 at Rizin Landmark Vol.1. He lost the bout via TKO in the first round.

Okuda faced Yuta Kubo at Rizin Landmark 4 on November 6, 2022. He lost the fight by TKO stoppage at the end of the first round.

Championships and accomplishments
Apache Pro-Wrestling Army
WEW World Tag Team Championship (1 time) – with Tomohiko Hashimoto
Dragon Gate
Open the Brave Gate Championship (1 time)
Pro Wrestling Illustrated
Ranked No. 302 of the top 500 singles wrestlers in the PWI 500 in 2021

Mixed martial arts record

|-
|Loss
|align=center|0–5
|Yuta Kubo
|TKO (elbows and punches)
|Rizin Landmark 4
|
|align=center|1
|align=center|4:43
|Nagoya, Japan
|
|-
|Loss
|align=center|0–4
|Grant Bogdanove
|Submission (face crank)
|Rizin Trigger 1
|
|align=center|1
|align=center|1:07
|Kobe, Japan
|
|-
|Loss
|align=center|0–3
|Hiroaki Suzuki
|TKO (knee and punches)
|Rizin Landmark Vol.1
|
|align=center|1
|align=center|1:42
|Tokyo, Japan
|
|-
|Loss
|align=center|0–2
|Tomoharu Toda
|DQ (kick to head of grounded fighter)
|Fighting Nexus 5
|
|align=center|1
|align=center|N/A
|Tokyo, Japan
|
|-
|Loss
|align=center|0–1
|Yuki Yamamoto
|TKO (knee and punches)
|Inoki Bom-Ba-Ye 2015
|
|align=center|1
|align=center|0:26
|Tokyo, Japan
|

References

External links
Dragon Gate profile 

Japanese male professional wrestlers
Japanese male mixed martial artists
Mixed martial artists utilizing Greco-Roman wrestling
Living people
1991 births
People from Tsu, Mie
21st-century professional wrestlers
Open the Brave Gate Champions